Peniocereus greggii is a cactus species native to Arizona, New Mexico, Texas (USA); and Chihuahua, Coahuila, Durango, Sonora, and Zacatecas (Mexico). Common names include Arizona queen of the night, nightblooming cereus and Reina de la noche.  The species name greggii honors Josiah Gregg (1806 – 1850), a merchant, explorer, naturalist, and author of the American Southwest and Northern Mexico.

Description

This cactus has stems about 1/2-1 inch wide with 6-9 edges. Its flowers are white, up to 30 centimetres in diameter with a scent redolent of vanilla. The flowers open after sundown, closing and wasting after a few hours. By 9 am the next day they are gone.
They usually bloom one night a year in June or July.  In any given area, they all bloom at the same time.  They look dead during the rest of the year. They have a large tuber that tastes a bit like a potato.  They tend to be ubiquitous throughout the higher Sonoran Desert area around Tucson.  See "A Natural History of the Sonoran Desert" published by the Arizona-Sonora Desert Museum, pg 197.

Tohono Chul in Tucson, Arizona  has the largest private collection of Sonoran Desert native Night-blooming Cereus - Peniocereus greggii. Each summer this botanical garden/museum hosts "Bloom Night," the one night each summer it is predicted the greatest number of cereus flowers will be in bloom, opening from 6pm until midnight to allow guests to stroll the grounds and view the flowers.

See also 
 Nightblooming cereus - for others, and especially Selenicereus grandiflorus
 List of edible cacti

References

External links 
 Desert-tropicals.com: Night Blooming Cereus, Reina de la Noche. Scientific Name: Peniocereus greggii
 Time lapse of plant from bud to bloom 
 

Night-blooming plants
greggii
Flora of Arizona
Cacti of Mexico
Cacti of the United States